WBGR-FM (93.7 FM; "The Big FM") is a radio station broadcasting an oldies format. Licensed to Monroe, Wisconsin, United States, the station is owned by Big Radio. Their studios are east of Monroe, at W4765 Radio Lane. The transmitter site is southwest of Monroe, on Franklin Road.  Co-owned WEKZ broadcasts at 1260 AM and features a classic country format.

History
Until December 2010, WEKZ-FM was known as "The Big Easy 93.7" for many years and had broadcast an adult contemporary format. Prior to adult contemporary, WEKZ-FM ran a Beautiful Music format as "EZ 93".

On January 14, 2013, it was announced in a joint press conference between Sly Sylvester and WEKZ-FM management that Sly would join the station after being laid off from WTDY.

On October 9, 2014, a thief stole wire and components from the station's tower, however was arrested and charged with felony theft.

The station changed its call sign to WBGR-FM on January 4, 2016.

References

External links

BGR-FM
Radio stations established in 1959
1959 establishments in Wisconsin
Oldies radio stations in the United States